Abu Ubaidah bin Redza is a Malaysian politician and served as Negeri Sembilan State Executive Councillor.

Election results

Honours 
  :
  Knight Commander of the Order of Loyalty to Negeri Sembilan (DPNS) – Dato' (2014)

References 

Living people
Year of birth missing (living people)
People from Negeri Sembilan
Malaysian people of Malay descent
Malaysian Muslims
United Malays National Organisation politicians
Members of the Negeri Sembilan State Legislative Assembly
Negeri Sembilan state executive councillors
21st-century Malaysian politicians
University of Malaya alumni